The Presidential and Vice-Presidential Artifacts Museum is a museum located in Academia Historica, Zhongzheng District, Taipei, Taiwan, Republic of China. The museum's collection includes collections and archives belonging to previous Presidents of the Republic of China.

The collection also includes furniture and artwork which belonged to previous Presidents as well a digital reading room which contains 1,100 publications and 687 books related to ROC presidents.

Building
The Presidential Museum used to be the Communications Bureau affiliated to the Governor-General's Office during the Japanese occupation of Taiwan.

The building also represents a turning point from the Classicism to Modernism in Taiwanese architectural history.  The construction began in 1921 and completed in 1924, equipping this building with then state of the art facilities such as elevators, fire-proofing, and earthquake protections.

After taking over this building from the Ministry of Transportation and Communications in 2006, the Academica Historica renovated and transformed the site into the Presidential Museum.

Transportation
The museum is accessible within walking distance South East from Ximen Station of the Taipei Metro.

See also
 Presidential Office Building
 List of museums in Taiwan

References

External links

Presidential and Vice-Presidential Artifacts Museum

2010 establishments in Taiwan
Museums established in 2010
Museums in Taipei
Presidency of the Republic of China